Janette Loreto Garin (born Janette Petilla Loreto; December 11, 1972) is a Filipina physician and politician who, since 2019, has been serving as the Representative for Iloilo's 1st district, a position she previously served in from 2004 to 2013. She was the Secretary of Health from 2015 to 2016 in the administration of President Benigno Aquino III. She is also a former provincial board member of Leyte.

As a congresswoman, she focused on various health issues such as curbing fraud in PhilHealth and amending the Physician's Act among others. She has also advocated for women's issues, including pushing for the passage of the Responsible Parenthood and Reproductive Health Act of 2012. She played an active role in the enactment of the Cheaper Medicines Law and the Magna Carta of Women.

Biography 

Garin graduated cum laude with a degree of Bachelor of Science in Medical Technology at the Divine World University in Tacloban. She was an academic scholar at St. Luke's College of Medicine. She transferred and completed her Doctor of Medicine at the Iloilo Doctors' College. At the same time she served as a board member in the Province of Leyte. She also had two years of residency training in Obstetrics and Gynecology at the Iloilo Doctor's Hospital. She served as board member of the Province of Iloilo for 6 years.

Garin was elected as the first Filipino board member to the Parliamentary Network on the World Bank (PNoWB) during its Sixth Annual Conference held in Helsinki, Finland on October 21–22, 2005. She was re-elected to this post to the following conference in Paris. Garin has also represented the Philippines in various conferences conducted by the Asian Forum of Parliamentarians on Population and Development (AFPPD).

Personal life 
She is married to Richard S. Garin, son of former Iloilo House of Representative Oscar Gemarino Garin and Ninfa Serag Garin. On August 18, 2021, Garin tested positive for COVID-19.

References 

1972 births
Living people
Lakas–CMD politicians
Secretaries of Health of the Philippines
Members of the House of Representatives of the Philippines from Iloilo
People from Iloilo
Politicians from Leyte (province)
Benigno Aquino III administration cabinet members
Women members of the Cabinet of the Philippines
Women members of the House of Representatives of the Philippines
21st-century Filipino women politicians
21st-century Filipino politicians